Capaldo was an unincorporated community in Crawford County, Kansas, United States.  It is currently part of the city of Frontenac, and located northwest of the Frontenac Industrial Park #1.

History
Capaldo had its start in the year 1912 as a coal mining camp. It was originally populated chiefly by Italian immigrants.

In the early 2000s, the community was annexed into the city of Frontenac.

References

Further reading

External links
 Crawford County maps: Current, Historic, KDOT

Unincorporated communities in Crawford County, Kansas
Unincorporated communities in Kansas